Sulfotransferase 1A3/1A4 is an enzyme that in humans is encoded by the SULT1A3 gene.

Sulfotransferase enzymes catalyze the sulfate conjugation of many hormones, neurotransmitters, drugs, and xenobiotic compounds. These cytosolic enzymes are different in their tissue distributions and substrate specificities. The gene structure (number and length of exons) is similar among family members. This gene encodes a phenol sulfotransferase with thermolabile enzyme activity. Four sulfotransferase genes are located on the p arm of chromosome 16; this gene and SULT1A4 arose from a segmental duplication. This gene is the most centromeric of the four sulfotransferase genes. Exons of this gene overlap with exons of a gene that encodes a protein containing GIY-YIG domains (GIYD1). Three alternatively spliced variants that encode the same protein have been described.

References

Further reading

External links